Frederick Bull  (c. 1714–1784) was Lord Mayor of London and a radical politician who sat in the House of Commons from 1773 to 1784.

Early life and business
Bull was the second son of John Bull  of London, and his wife  Hannah. He married Judith Dickinson of Ware on 26  August 1737. From about 1744 he was a tea merchant in Leadenhall Street.  He succeeded to property at Little Paxton, Huntingdonshire from his mother in 1746. He went into partnership with Samuel Moody in around 1757.

Public and political career
Bull was Sheriff of London in 1771–2 and became an alderman in 1772. He became Lord Mayor of London for 1773–74. 
 
Bull stood for the City of London at a by-election in 1773 and was returned after a hard-fought contest on 23 December 1773. He was returned for the City after a contest again in 1774 and 1780.
    
Bull was a Dissenter and close supporter of John Wilkes. He followed the Bill of Rights Society programme throughout his parliamentary career. His politics were radical and anti-Popery and in the spring of 1780 he supported Lord George Gordon’s Protestant crusade which led to the riots in June.

Later life
Bull retired from business about 1782. He died on 10 January 1784.

References

1710s births
1784 deaths
Year of birth uncertain
Sheriffs of the City of London
18th-century lord mayors of London
Members of the Parliament of Great Britain for English constituencies
British MPs 1768–1774
British MPs 1774–1780
British MPs 1780–1784